Encyclopedia of Things That Never Were is a book by Robert Ingpen and Michael Page published in 1985.

Plot summary
Encyclopedia of Things That Never Were is a book detailing myth and magic written by Page and painted by Ingpen.

Reception
Dave Langford reviewed Encyclopedia of Things That Never Were for White Dwarf #74, and stated that "Good marks for production and eclecticism beyond the usual European and Greek myths: but at [the price] there'd have to be a really yawning space on your coffee table."

Reviews
Review by Chris Morgan (1986) in Fantasy Review, February 1986
Review by Don D'Ammassa (1987) in Science Fiction Chronicle, #89 February 1987
Review by Baird Searles (1987) in Isaac Asimov's Science Fiction Magazine, November 1987

References

Mythology books